Friend Request Pending is a 2011 British comedy-drama short film written and produced by Chris Croucher and directed by Chris Foggin. It stars Judi Dench, Tom Hiddleston, and Philip Jackson.  It was included in the feature film Stars in Shorts.

Plot
Mary (Dench) and Linda (Ryder) spend an afternoon discussing the pleasures, pitfalls and problems with using social networking to try and woo the local choirmaster and Mary's new love interest, Trevor (Jackson). While chatting on Facebook, Mary's son Tom (Hiddleston) IM's her, earning a response from Linda about wanting to "poke" him. When Linda leaves to go to the market, Trevor finally gains the courage and asks Mary out. When Linda returns, she finds Mary has gone out with Trevor, and decides to do a little Facebook flirting of her own and decides to send a friend request to Tom.

Cast
Judi Dench as Mary
Tom Hiddleston as Tom
Philip Jackson as Trevor
John Macmillan as Jason, Tom's friend
Penny Ryder as Linda

Production

Development
Production began on FRP back in December 2010 when director Chris Foggin first approached writer Chris Croucher with the information that Judi Dench had agreed to make a project with him.

Penny Ryder has been a close friend of Judi's for years, so when the offer came to play opposite Judi, as her best friend, she didn't waste any time saying yes.

Filming
The film was shot in Ealing, England over the course of two days in May 2011.

Awards
The short film won Best Comedy Short at the 2012 Rhode Island Film Festival and received the Director's Choice Award for Best Comedy Film at the 2012 Ricon Film Festival. It gained the Audience Special Recognition at the 2012 Aspen ShortsFest, Short Film Honorable Mention at the 2012 Omaha Film Festival, and Special Jury Award for the Best Ensemble Cast at the 2012 Savannah Film Festival.

References

External links
 

British romance films
British comedy-drama films
British drama short films
Films about social media
2010s English-language films
2010s British films